Equisetum bogotense, the Andean horsetail, is a herbaceous perennial that reproduces through spores.  It has thicker less bushy whorled branches, and a silica rich rhizomatous stem, which roots grow out of, under ground.  This stem is a dull dark brown color with glabrous growth aside from the sheathed segments.  The plant has a history as a traditional herbal remedy, and a study of its diuretic effects on humans showed significant increases in urinary sodium, potassium, and chloride.  Human and animal trials of indicate that E. bogotense has "high" efficacy as a diuretic. It is used in several modern herbal supplements. The species epithet refers to Bogotá, the capital of Colombia.

A segregate species, Equisetum rinihuense, has been described.

According to a recent study, this species may be the most isolated of all the genus, being more closely related with fossil Equisetums rather than living ones .

References

External links 
 Binomial
 Basic information on the Andean horsetail

bogotense
Flora of Colombia
Altiplano Cundiboyacense